John Barry Humphries  (born 17 February 1934) is an Australian comedian, actor, author and satirist. He is best known for writing and playing his on-stage and television alter egos Dame Edna Everage and Sir Les Patterson. He is also a film producer and script writer, a star of London's West End musical theatre, a writer, and a landscape painter. For his delivery of dadaist and absurdist humour to millions, biographer Anne Pender described Humphries in 2010 as not only "the most significant theatrical figure of our time … [but] the most significant comedian to emerge since Charlie Chaplin".

Humphries' characters have brought him international renown, and he also appeared in numerous stage productions, films, and television shows. Originally conceived as a dowdy Moonee Ponds housewife who caricatured Australian suburban complacency and insularity, Dame Edna Everage has evolved over four decades to become a satire of stardom – a gaudily dressed, acid-tongued, egomaniacal, internationally fêted "Housewife Gigastar".

Humphries' other satirical characters include the "priapic and inebriated cultural attaché" Sir Les Patterson, who has "continued to bring worldwide discredit upon Australian arts and culture, while contributing as much to the Australian vernacular as he has borrowed from it"; gentle, grandfatherly "returned gentleman" Sandy Stone; iconoclastic 1960s underground film-maker Martin Agrippa; Paddington socialist academic Neil Singleton; sleazy trade union official Lance Boyle; high-pressure art salesman Morrie O'Connor; failed tycoon Owen Steele; and archetypal Australian bloke Barry McKenzie.

Early life

Humphries was born on 17 February 1934 in the suburb of Kew in Melbourne, Victoria, the son of Eric Humphries ( John Albert Eric Humphries) (1905-1972), a construction manager, and his wife Louisa Agnes ( Brown) (1907-1984). His grandfather was an emigrant to Australia from Manchester, England. His father was well-to-do and Barry grew up in a "clean, tasteful, and modern home" on Christowel Street, Camberwell, then one of Melbourne's new "garden suburbs". His early home life set the pattern for his eventual stage career; his parents bought him everything he wanted, but his father in particular spent little time with him, and Humphries spent hours playing at dressing-up in the back garden.

His parents nicknamed him "Sunny Sam", and his early childhood was happy and uneventful. However, in his teens Humphries began to rebel against the strictures of conventional suburban life by becoming "artistic", much to the dismay of his parents who, despite their affluence, distrusted "art". A key event took place when he was nine – his mother gave all his books to The Salvation Army, cheerfully explaining: "But you've read them, Barry".

Humphries responded by becoming a voracious reader, a collector of rare books, a painter, a theatre fan and a surrealist. Dressing up in a black cloak, black homburg and mascaraed eyes, he invented his first sustained character, "Dr Aaron Azimuth", agent provocateur, dandy and Dadaist.

Education

Educated firstly at Camberwell Grammar School, Humphries has been awarded his place in the Gallery of Achievement there. As his father's building business prospered, Humphries was sent to Melbourne Grammar School where he spurned sport, detested mathematics, shirked cadets "on the basis of conscientious objection" and matriculated with brilliant results in English and Art. Humphries himself described this schooling, in a Who's Who entry, as "self-educated, attended Melbourne Grammar School".

Humphries spent two years studying at the University of Melbourne, where he studied Law, Philosophy and Fine Arts. During this time he was a Private in the Melbourne University Regiment, serving a period of National Service in the CMF of the Australian Army. He did not graduate from university (although he would receive an honorary doctorate almost 50 years later). During this time he became Australia's leading exponent of the deconstructive and absurdist art movement, Dada. The Dadaist pranks and performances he mounted in Melbourne were experiments in anarchy and visual satire which have become part of Australian folklore. An exhibit entitled "Pus in Boots" consisted of a pair of Wellington boots filled with custard; a mock pesticide product called "Platytox" claimed on its box to be effective against the platypus, a beloved and protected species in Australia. He was part of a group that made a series of Dada-influenced recordings in Melbourne from 1952 to 1953. "Wubbo Music" (Humphries has said that "wubbo" is a pseudo-Aboriginal word meaning "nothing") is thought to be one of the earliest recordings of experimental music in Australia. Other exhibits include "Creche Bang", a pram covered in meat and "Eye and Spoon Race", a spoon with a sheep's eye.

Humphries was legendary for his provocative public pranks. One infamous example involved Humphries dressing as a Frenchman, with an accomplice dressed as a blind person; the accomplice would board a tram, followed soon after by Humphries. At the appropriate juncture Humphries would force his way past the "blind" man, yelling "Get out of my way, you disgusting blind person", kicking him viciously in the shins and then jumping off the tram and making his escape in a waiting car.

An even more extreme example was his notorious "sick bag" prank. This involved carrying on to an aircraft a tin of Heinz Russian Salad, which he would then surreptitiously empty into an air-sickness bag. At the appropriate point in the flight, he would pretend to vomit loudly and violently into the bag. Then, to the horror of passengers and crew, he would proceed to eat the contents. One April Fools' Day Humphries placed a roast dinner and glass of champagne in an inner-city rubbish bin. Later in the morning, when there were many businesspeople queuing at a nearby building, Humphries approached the group as a dirty, dishevelled man. He walked to the bin, opened the lid and proceeded to lift the roast and glass of champagne and drink from the glass. Much to the amazement of those watching, he found a suitable seating area and began to eat the meal. Such stunts were the early manifestations of a lifelong interest in the bizarre, discomforting, and subversive.

Early career in Australia
Humphries had written and performed songs and sketches in university revues, so after leaving university he joined the newly formed Melbourne Theatre Company (MTC). It was at this point that he created the first incarnation of what became his best-known character, Edna Everage. The first stage sketch to feature Mrs Norm Everage, called "Olympic Hostess", premiered at Melbourne University's Union Theatre on 12 December 1955. 

In his award-winning autobiography, More Please (1992), Humphries relates that he had created a character similar to Edna in the back of a bus while touring country Victoria in Twelfth Night with the MTC at the age of 20. He credited his then mentor, Peter O'Shaughnessy, that without his "nurturing and promotion, the character of Edna Everage would have been nipped in the bud after 1956 and never come to flower, while the character of Sandy Stone would never have taken shape as a presence on the stage".

In 1957 Humphries moved to Sydney and joined Sydney's Phillip Street Theatre, which became Australia's leading venue for revue and satirical comedy over the next decade. His first appearance at Phillip Street was in the satirical revue Two to One, starring veteran Australian musical star Max Oldaker, with a cast including Humphries and future Number 96 star Wendy Blacklock. Although he had originally assumed Edna's debut Melbourne appearance would be a one-off, Humphries decided to revive "Olympic Hostess" for Phillip Street and its success helped to launch what became a fifty-year career for the self-proclaimed "Housewife Superstar" (later Megastar, then Gigastar).

The next Phillip Street revue was Around the Loop, which again teamed Oldaker, Gordon Chater, Blacklock and Humphries, plus newcomer June Salter. Humphries revived the Edna character (for what he said would be the last time) and the revue proved to be a major hit, playing eight shows a week for 14 months. During this period Humphries was living near Bondi and while out walking one day he had a chance meeting with an elderly man who had a high, scratchy voice and a pedantic manner of speech; this encounter inspired the creation of another of Humphries' most enduring characters, Sandy Stone.

In September 1957, Humphries appeared as Estragon in Waiting for Godot, in Australia's first production of the Samuel Beckett play at the Arrow Theatre in Melbourne directed by Peter O'Shaughnessy who played Vladimir.

In 1958, Humphries and O'Shaughnessy collaborated on and appeared in the Rock'n'Reel Revue at the New Theatre in Melbourne where Humphries brought the characters of Mrs Everage and Sandy Stone into the psyche of Melbourne audiences. In the same year, Humphries made his first commercial recording, the EP Wild Life in Suburbia, which featured liner notes by his friend, the Modernist architect and writer Robin Boyd.

London and the 1960s
In 1959 Humphries moved to London, where he lived and worked throughout the 1960s. He became a friend of leading members of the British comedy scene including Dudley Moore, Peter Cook, Alan Bennett, Jonathan Miller, Spike Milligan, Willie Rushton and fellow Australian expatriate comedian-actors John Bluthal and Dick Bentley. Humphries performed at Cook's comedy venue The Establishment, where he became a friend of and was photographed by leading photographer Lewis Morley, whose studio was located above the club. He contributed to the satirical magazine Private Eye, of which Cook was publisher, his best-known work being the cartoon strip The Wonderful World of Barry McKenzie. The bawdy cartoon satire of the worst aspects of Australians abroad was written by Humphries and drawn by New Zealand born cartoonist Nicholas Garland. The book version of the comic strip, published in the late '60s, was for some time banned in Australia.

Humphries appeared in numerous West End stage productions including the musicals Oliver! and Maggie May, by Lionel Bart, and in stage and radio productions by his friend Spike Milligan. At one time he was invited to play the leading role of Captain Martin Bules in The Bedsitting Room which had already opened successfully at the Mermaid Theatre and was transferring to the West End. Humphries performed with Milligan in the 1968 production of Treasure Island in the role of Long John Silver. He described working with Milligan as "one of the strangest and most exhilarating experiences of my career".

In 1961 when Humphries was in Cornwall with his wife, he fell over a cliff near Zennor and landed on a ledge 50 m (150 ft) below, breaking bones. The rescue by helicopter was filmed by a news crew from ITN. The footage of the rescue was shown to Humphries for the first time on a 2006 BBC show, Turn Back Time.

Humphries' first major break on the British stage came when he was cast in the role of the undertaker Mr Sowerberry for the original 1960 London stage production of Oliver! He recorded Sowerberry's feature number "That's Your Funeral" for the original London cast album (released on Decca Records) and reprised the role when the production moved to Broadway in 1963. However, the song "That's Your Funeral" was omitted from the RCA Victor original Broadway cast album so Humphries is not heard at all on it. In 1967 he starred as Fagin in the Piccadilly Theatre's revival of Oliver! which featured a young Phil Collins as the Artful Dodger. In 1997 Humphries reprised the role of Fagin in Cameron Mackintosh's award-winning revival at the London Palladium.

In 1967 his friendship with Cook and Moore led to his first film role, a cameo as "Envy" in the film Bedazzled starring Cook and Moore with Eleanor Bron and directed by Stanley Donen. The following year he appeared in The Bliss of Mrs. Blossom with Shirley MacLaine.

Humphries contributed to BBC Television's The Late Show (1966–67), but Humphries found his true calling with his one-man satirical stage revues, in which he performed as Edna Everage and other character creations, including Les Patterson and Sandy Stone. A Nice Night's Entertainment (1962) was the first such revue. It and Excuse I: Another Nice Night's Entertainment (1965) were only performed in Australia. In 1968 Humphries returned to Australia to tour his one-man revue Just a Show; this production transferred to London's Fortune Theatre in 1969. Humphries gained considerable notoriety with Just a Show. It polarised British critics but was successful enough to lead to a short-lived BBC television series, The Barry Humphries Scandals, one of the precursors to the Monty Python series.

1970s
In 1970 Humphries returned to Australia, where Edna Everage made her movie debut in John B. Murray's The Naked Bunyip. In 1971–72 he teamed up with producer Phillip Adams and writer-director Bruce Beresford to create a film version of the Barry McKenzie cartoons. The Adventures of Barry McKenzie starred singer Barry Crocker in the title role and featured Humphries—who co-wrote the script with Beresford—playing three different parts. It was filmed in England and Australia with an all-star cast including Spike Milligan, Peter Cook, Dennis Price, Dick Bentley, Willie Rushton, Julie Covington, Clive James and broadcaster Joan Bakewell. Like several other films of the time which have since been categorised as belonging to the Ocker genre of Australian film, it was almost unanimously panned by Australian film critics, but became a huge hit with audiences. In fact, the film became the most successful locally made feature ever released in Australia up to that time, paving the way for the success of subsequent locally made feature films such as Alvin Purple and Picnic at Hanging Rock.

Another artistic production undertaken at this time was a 1972 collaboration between Humphries and the Australian composer Nigel Butterley. Together they produced First Day Covers, a collection of poems about suburbia – read in performance by Edna Everage – with accompanying music by Butterley. It included poems with titles such as "Histoire du Lamington" and "Morceau en forme de 'meat pie'".

Film roles
Since the late 1960s Humphries has appeared in numerous films, mostly in supporting or cameo roles. His credits include Bedazzled (1967), the UK sex comedy Percy's Progress (1974), David Baker's The Great Macarthy (1975), and Bruce Beresford's Barry McKenzie Holds His Own (1974), in which Edna was made a Dame by then Australian Prime Minister Gough Whitlam.

Other film credits include Side by Side (1975) and The Getting of Wisdom (1977). The same year, he had a cameo as Edna in the Robert Stigwood musical film Sgt. Pepper's Lonely Hearts Club Band (which became infamous as one of the biggest film flops of the decade), followed in 1981 by his part as the fake-blind TV-show host Bert Schnick in Shock Treatment, the sequel to The Rocky Horror Picture Show.

Humphries was more successful with his featured role as Richard Deane in Dr. Fischer of Geneva (1985); this was followed by Howling III (1987), a cameo as Rupert Murdoch in the miniseries Selling Hitler (1991) with Alexei Sayle, a three-role cameo in Philippe Mora's horror satire Pterodactyl Woman from Beverly Hills (1995), the role of Count Metternich in Immortal Beloved (1994), as well as roles in The Leading Man (1996), the Spice Girls' film Spice World, the Australian feature Welcome to Woop Woop (1997), and Nicholas Nickleby (2002), in which he donned female garb to play Nathan Lane's wife.

Humphries has featured in various roles in comedy performance films including The Secret Policeman's Other Ball (1982) and A Night of Comic Relief 2 (1989). In 1987, he starred as Les Patterson in one of his own rare flops, the disastrous Les Patterson Saves the World, directed by George T. Miller of Man From Snowy River fame and co-written by Humphries with his third wife, Diane Millstead.

In 2003, Humphries voiced the shark Bruce in the Pixar animated film Finding Nemo, using an exaggerated baritone Australian accent.

During 2011, Humphries travelled to New Zealand to perform the role of the Great Goblin in the first instalment of Peter Jackson's three-part adaptation of J. R. R. Tolkien's The Hobbit. At the press conference in Wellington, NZ, just before the film's world premiere, Humphries commented:

In 2015, Humphries voiced the role of Wombo the Wombat in Blinky Bill the Movie.

In 2016, he appeared in a dual role in Absolutely Fabulous: The Movie as Charlie, a rich former lover of Patsy Stone, and in a nonspeaking cameo as Dame Edna.

One-man shows
Humphries' forte has always been his one-man satirical stage revues, in which he appears as Edna Everage and other character creations, most commonly Les Patterson and Sandy Stone. The remarkable longevity he has enjoyed with Dame Edna has endured for more than sixty years, but in 2012 he announced his retirement from live performance.

Humphries' one-man shows, which are typically two and a half hours long, alternate satirical monologues and musical numbers and consist of entirely original material, laced with ad-libbing, improvisation and audience participation segments. Humphries mostly performs solo, but he is occasionally joined on stage by supporting dancers and an accompanist during the musical numbers. Only one actor ever regularly shared the stage with Humphries, and this was during the Edna segments: English actress Emily Perry played Edna's long-suffering bridesmaid from New Zealand, Madge Allsop, whose character never spoke.

Humphries has presented many successful shows in London, most of which he subsequently toured internationally. Although he eventually gained worldwide popularity, he encountered stiff resistance in the early years of his career: his first London one-man show, A Nice Night's Entertainment (1962), received scathing reviews, and it was several years before he made a second attempt. He gained considerable notoriety with his next one-man revue, Just a Show, staged at London's Fortune Theatre in 1969. It polarised the critics but was a hit with audiences and became the basis of a growing cult following in the UK. He built on this with his early '70s shows, including A Load of Olde Stuffe (1971) and At Least You Can Say You've Seen It (1974–75).

He finally broke through to widespread critical and audience acclaim in Britain with his 1976 London production Housewife, Superstar! at the Apollo Theatre. Its success in Britain and Australia led Humphries to try his luck with the show in New York in 1977 at the off-Broadway Theatre Four (now called the Julia Miles Theatre), but it proved to be a disastrous repeat of his experience with Just a Show. Humphries later summed up his negative reception by saying: "When The New York Times tells you to close, you close."

His next show was Isn't It Pathetic at His Age (1978), and, like many of his shows, the title derives from the sarcastic remarks his mother often made when she took Humphries to the theatre to see superannuated overseas actors touring in Australia during his youth.

His subsequent one-man shows include:
 A Night with Dame Edna (1979), for which he won an Olivier Award for Best Comedy Performance
 An Evening's Intercourse with Dame Edna (1982)
 Three seasons of Back with a Vengeance (1987–1989, 2005–2007)
 Look at Me When I'm Talking to You (1996)
 Edna, The Spectacle (1998) at the Theatre Royal Haymarket, where he held the record as the only solo act to fill the theatre (since it opened in 1663).
 Remember You're Out which toured Australia in 1999
 Back with a Vengeance which toured Australia in 2007
 Dame Edna Live: The First Last Tour toured the US in 2009

He has made numerous theatrical tours in Germany, Scandinavia, the Netherlands, and in the Far and Middle East. In 2003 he toured Australia with his show Getting Back to My Roots (and Other Suckers).

Farewell tour

In March 2012, Humphries announced his retirement from live entertainment, stating that he was "beginning to feel a bit senior" and was planning to retire from show business. Humphries announced his Australian "Farewell Tour", titled "Eat, Pray, Laugh!", to begin in Canberra on 22 July 2012 and to conclude in Perth on 3 February 2013, although it was extended until 10 February. The show included appearances by Dame Edna, Sir Les Patterson and Sandy Stone, and introduced a new character called Gerard Patterson, Sir Les's brother and paedophilic Catholic priest.

The tour was widely praised. Dan Ilic of Time Out Sydney stated that Humphries delivered "a show that almost feels like a blue print for the foundations for the last fifty years of Australian comedy". Helen Musa of CityNews gave a similarly positive review, referring to Humphries being "as virile, as vulgar and as magnificent as ever" thanks to a "well researched" script. Arts blog Critter Away referred to Humphries' characters as being "still fresh" and "a testament to laugh-out-loud satire".

The same show opened in the United Kingdom at the Milton Keynes Theatre in October 2013 prior to a season of shows at the London Palladium and a national tour.

Weimar Cabaret
Humphries emceed a programme of Weimar Republic cabaret songs performed by chanteuse Meow Meow and accompanied by the Australian Chamber Orchestra in July–August 2016 and then by the Aurora Orchestra in July 2018.

Dame Edna

Dame Edna Everage is one of the most enduring Australian comic characters of all time. Originally conceived in 1956, Edna has evolved from a satire of Australian suburbia to become, in the words of journalist Caroline Overington:

Like her ever-present bunches of gladioli, one of the most popular and distinctive features of Edna's stage and TV appearances has been her extravagant wardrobe, with gaudy, custom-made gowns. Her costumes, most of which were created for her by Australian designer Bill Goodwin, routinely incorporate Aussie kitsch icons such as the flag, Australian native animals and flowers, the Sydney Opera House and the boxing kangaroo. Her outlandish spectacles were inspired by the glasses worn by Melbourne eccentric, beautician, radio broadcaster, actor and dancer Stephanie Deste; as were many other aspects of Dame Edna's personality.

As the character evolved, Edna's unseen family became an integral part of the satire, particularly the travails of her disabled husband Norm, who had an almost lifelong onslaught of an unspecified prostate ailment. Her daughter Valmai and her gay-hairdresser son Kenny became intrinsic elements of the act, as did her long-suffering best friend and New Zealand bridesmaid, Madge Allsop.

Throughout Edna's career, Madge Allsop was played by English actress Emily Perry until her death in 2008. Perry was the only other actor ever to appear on stage with Humphries in his stage shows, as well as making regular appearances in Dame Edna's TV programmes.

Dame Edna made a successful transition from stage to TV without losing popularity in either genre. The talk show format provided a perfect outlet for Humphries' rapier wit and his ability to ad-lib, and it enabled Edna to draw on a wide and appreciative pool of fans among fellow actors and comedians, with scores of top-rank stars lining up to be lampooned on her shows. As other Australian actors have begun to make a wider impression in international film and television, Edna has not hesitated to reveal that it was her mentorship which helped "kiddies" like "little Nicole Kidman" to achieve their early success.

Sir Les Patterson 
Humphries' character Sir Les Patterson is a boozy Australian cultural attaché: dishevelled, uncouth, lecherous and coarse. He alternates with Edna and Sandy Stone in Humphries' stage shows and typically features in pre-recorded segments in Dame Edna's TV shows. Sir Les is the polar opposite of Dame Edna; she a culturally aspirational Protestant from Melbourne and he a culture-free Roman Catholic from Sydney. In December 1987, Barry Humphries appeared on the BBC Radio 4 Today programme in a recorded interview in which he simultaneously played the characters of both Dame Edna and Sir Les.

Sandy Stone 
Humphries' character, Sandy Stone, is an elderly Australian man, either single or married with a daughter who died as a child. Humphries said in 2016 that "slowly the character has deepened, so I begin to understand and appreciate him, and finally feel myself turning into him". He no longer requires makeup for the part, and plays Sandy in his own dressing gown.

Television roles
Humphries' numerous television appearances in Australia, the UK and the US include The Bunyip, a children's comedy for the Seven Network in Melbourne. In the UK he made two highly successful series of his comedy talk show The Dame Edna Experience for London Weekend Television. The series boasted a phalanx of superstar guests including Liza Minnelli, Sean Connery, Roger Moore, Dusty Springfield, Charlton Heston and Jane Seymour.

These enormously popular programmes have since been repeated worldwide and the special A Night on Mount Edna won Humphries the Golden Rose of Montreux in 1991. He wrote and starred in ABC-TV's The Life and Death of Sandy Stone (1991), and presented the ABC social history series Barry Humphries' Flashbacks (1999).

His other television shows and one-off specials include Dame Edna's Neighbourhood Watch (1992), Dame Edna's Work Experience (1996), Dame Edna Kisses It Better (1997) and Dame Edna's Hollywood (1991–92), a series of three chat-show specials filmed in the US for the NBC and the Fox network. Like The Dame Edna Experience, these included an array of top celebrity guests such as Burt Reynolds, Cher, Bea Arthur, Kim Basinger and Barry Manilow. Edna's most recent television special was Dame Edna Live at the Palace in 2003. He starred in the Kath & Kim telemovie Da Kath & Kim Code in late 2005.

In 1977 Dame Edna guest-starred on the U.S. sketch comedy and variety show Saturday Night Live.

In 2007, Humphries returned to the UK's ITV to host another comedy chat-show called The Dame Edna Treatment, a similar format to The Dame Edna Experience from 20 years earlier. The series once again boasted a collection of top celebrity guests such as Tim Allen, Mischa Barton, Sigourney Weaver, Debbie Harry, and Shirley Bassey.

In March 2008, Humphries joined the judging panel on the BBC talent show I'd Do Anything to find an unknown lead to play the part of Nancy in a West End revival of the musical Oliver!.

In May 2013, Australia's ABC Network announced that Humphries would be joining the cast of Australian telemovie series, Jack Irish, playing a high-profile judge in the third movie in the series. He appeared as Justice Loder in the 2014 "Dead Point" episode.

Success in the United States

In 2000 Humphries took his Dame Edna: The Royal Tour show to North America winning the inaugural Special Tony Award for a Live Theatrical Event in 2000 and won two National Broadway Theatre Awards for "Best Play" and for "Best Actor" in 2001. Asked by an Australian journalist what it was like to win a Tony Award, he said "it was like winning a thousand Gold Logies at the same time".

Dame Edna's new-found success in America led to many media opportunities, including a semi-regular role in the hit TV series Ally McBeal. Vanity Fair magazine invited Dame Edna to write a satirical advice column in 2003 although after an outcry following a remark about learning Spanish, the column was discontinued.

As of September 2021, he was honorary vice-president of the American Guild of Variety Artists trade union.

Personal life
Humphries has been married four times. His first marriage, to Brenda Wright, took place when he was 21 and lasted less than two years. He has two daughters, Tessa and Emily, and two sons, Oscar and Rupert, from his second and third marriages, to Rosalind Tong and Diane Millstead respectively. His elder son Oscar was editor of the art magazine Apollo and a contributing editor at The Spectator. He is now an art curator. His fourth wife (since 1990), Elizabeth "Lizzie" Spender, previously an actor, is the daughter of British poet Sir Stephen Spender and the concert pianist Natasha Spender. They live in a terraced town house in West Hampstead, his home for forty years.

In the 1960s, throughout his sojourn in London, Humphries became increasingly dependent on alcohol and by the last years of the decade his friends and family began to fear that his addiction might cost him his career or even his life. His status as 'a dissolute, guilt-ridden, self-pitying boozer' was undoubtedly one of the main reasons for the failure of his first marriage and was a contributing factor to the collapse of the second.

Humphries' alcoholism reached a crisis point during a visit home to Australia in the early 1970s. His parents finally had him admitted to a private hospital to 'dry out' when, after a particularly heavy binge, he was found bashed and unconscious in a gutter. Since then he has abstained from alcohol completely and has in the past occasionally attended Alcoholics Anonymous (AA) meetings. He was one of the many friends who tried in vain to help Peter Cook, who himself eventually died from alcohol-related illnesses.

Humphries was a good friend of the English poet John Betjeman until Betjeman's death in 1984. Their friendship began in 1960 after Betjeman, while visiting Australia, heard some of Humphries' early recordings and wrote very favourably of them in an Australian newspaper. Their friendship was, in part, based around numerous shared interests, including Victorian architecture, Cornwall and the music hall.

Humphries appears in the 2013 documentary Chalky about his longtime friend and colleague Michael White, who produced many of Humphries' first Dame Edna shows in the UK.

Other notable friends of Humphries include the painter Arthur Boyd, the author and former politician Jeffrey Archer, whom Humphries visited during Archer's stay in prison, and the comedian Spike Milligan.

Humphries has spent much of his life immersed in music, literature and the arts. A self-proclaimed 'bibliomaniac', his house in West Hampstead, London supposedly contains some 25,000 books, many of them first editions of the late 19th and early 20th centuries. Some of the more arcane and rare items in this collection include the telephone book of Oscar Wilde, Memoirs of a Public Baby by Philip O'Connor, an autographed copy of Humdrum by Harold Acton, the complete works of Wilfred Childe and several volumes of the pre-war surrealist poetry of Herbert Read.

He is a prominent art collector who has, as a result of his three divorces, bought many of his favourite paintings four times. He at one time had the largest private collection of the paintings of Charles Conder in the world and he is a great lover of the Flemish symbolist painter Jan Frans De Boever, relishing his role as 'President for Life' of the De Boever Society. He himself is a landscape painter and his pictures are in private and public collections both in his homeland and abroad. Humphries has also been the subject of numerous portraits by artist friends, including Clifton Pugh (1958, National Portrait Gallery) and John Brack (in the character of Edna Everage, 1969, Art Gallery of New South Wales).

He is a lover of avant-garde music and a patron of, among others, the French composer Jean-Michel Damase and the Melba Foundation in Australia. Humphries is a patron and active supporter of the Tait Memorial Trust in London, a charity to support young Australian performing artists in the UK. When Humphries was on the BBC's Desert Island Discs radio programme in 2009, he made the following choices: "" from Strauss' Der Rosenkavalier; Gershwin's "Things are Looking Up" sung by Fred Astaire; "Love Song" composed by Josef Suk; "On Mother Kelly's Doorstep" sung by Randolph Sutton; "" from Schubert's Winterreise song cycle; the 2nd movement of Poulenc's Flute Sonata; Mischa Spoliansky's ""; and "They are not long the weeping and the laughter" from Delius' Songs of Sunset.

Cultural historian Tony Moore, author of The Barry McKenzie Movies, writes of Humphries' personal politics thus: "A conservative contrarian while many in his generation were moving left, Humphries nevertheless retained a bohemian delight in transgression that makes him a radical".

In 2018, Humphries faced backlash for making comments considered to be transphobic. The comments included referring to gender affirmation surgery as "self-mutilation" and transgender identity as a whole as a "fashion—how many different kinds of lavatory can you have?" The comments prompted the Barry Award, a comedy festival award in Melbourne named after the comedian, to be renamed the Melbourne International Comedy Festival Award the next year.

He has two brothers and a sister in Melbourne. His brother Christopher worked as an architect, his brother Michael (1946–2020) a teacher and historian, and sister Barbara also a former schoolteacher.

Other work

Bibliography 
Humphries is the author of many books including two autobiographies, two novels and a treatise on Chinese drama in the goldfields. He has written several plays and has made dozens of recordings. His first autobiography More Please won the J. R. Ackerley Prize for Autobiography in 1993.
Bizarre. Compilation. London: Elek Books, 1965.
The Barry Humphries Book of Innocent Austral Verse. Anthology. Melbourne: Sun Books, 1968.
Bazza Pulls It Off!: More Adventures of Barry McKenzie. Melbourne: Sun Books, 1971.
The Wonderful World of Barry MacKenzie. With Nicholas Garland; a comic strip. London: Private Eye/Andre Deutsch, 1971.
Barry McKenzie Holds His Own. Photoplay, with Bruce Beresford. Melbourne: Sun Books, 1974.
Dame Edna's Coffee Table Book: A guide to gracious living and the finer things of life by one of the first ladies of world theatre. Compendium. Sydney: Sphere Books, 1976.
Les Patterson's Australia. Melbourne: Sun Books, 1978.
Bazza Comes into His Own: The Final Fescennine Farago of Barry McKenzie, Australia's first working-class hero—with learned and scholarly appendices and a new enlarged glossary. With Nicholas Garland. Melbourne, Sun Books, 1979.
The Sound of Edna: Dame Edna's Family Songbook. With Nick Rowley. London: Chappell, 1979.
A Treasury of Australian Kitsch. Melbourne: Macmillan, 1980.
A Nice Night's Entertainment: Sketches and Monologues 1956–1981. A Retrospective. Sydney: Currency Press, 1981.
Dame Edna's Bedside Companion. Compendium. London: Weidenfeld and Nicolson, 1982.
Punch Down Under. London: Robson Books, 1984.
The Complete Barry McKenzie. Sydney: Allen & Unwin, 1988.
Shades of Sandy Stone. Edinburgh, Tragara Press, 1989. Limited edition.
My Gorgeous Life. As Edna Everage. London: Macmillan, 1989.
More Please. Autobiography. London, New York, Ringwood, Toronto, and Auckland: Viking, 1992.
The Life and Death of Sandy Stone. Sydney: Macmillan, 1990.
Neglected Poems and Other Creatures. Sydney: Angus & Robertson, 1991.
Women in the Background. Novel. Port Melbourne: William Heinemann Australia, 1995.
Barry Humphries' Flashbacks: The book of the acclaimed TV series. Sydney and London: HarperCollins, 1999.
My Life As Me: A Memoir: Autobiography. London: Michael Joseph, 2002.
Handling Edna: the Unauthorised Biography. Sydney, Hachette Australia, 2009.

Filmography
Bedazzled (1967) – Envy
The Adventures of Barry McKenzie (1972) – Aunt Edna Everage / Hoot / Dr DeLamphrey
Barry McKenzie Holds His Own (1974) – Aunt Edna Everage / Dr DeLamphrey
Percy's Progress (1974)
Side by Side (1975) – Rodney
The Great Macarthy (1975)
The Getting of Wisdom (1977)
Shock Treatment (1981) – Bert Schnick
Dr. Fischer of Geneva (1985)
Les Patterson Saves the World (1986) – Sir Les Patterson / Dame Edna Everage
Immortal Beloved (1994) – Klemens von Metternich
Napoleon (1995)
Pterodactyl Woman from Beverly Hills (1995) – Bert / Lady shopper / Manager
Spice World (1997) – Kevin McMaxford
Nicholas Nickleby (2002) - Mrs. Crummles
Finding Nemo (2003) – Bruce (voice)
Da Kath & Kim Code (2005) telemovie – John Monk
Mary and Max (2009) – narrator
The Kangaroo Gang (2011) TV documentary – narrator
The Hobbit: An Unexpected Journey (2012) – Great Goblin
Kath & Kimderella (2012) – Dame Edna Everage
Chalky (2013) documentary
Justin and the Knights of Valour (2013) – Braulio (voice)
 Blinky Bill the Movie (2015) – Wombo (voice)
Absolutely Fabulous: The Movie (2016) – Charlie and Dame Edna Everage (dual role)
The Magical Land of Oz (2019) Australian wildlife documentary, ABC – Narrator

Discography 
 Wild Life in Suburbia (1958)
 Wild Life in Suburbia Volume Two (1959)
 A Nice Night's Entertainment (1962)
 Chunder Down Under (1965)
 Barry Humphries at Carnegie Hall (1972)
 The Barry Humphries Record of Innocent Austral Verse (1972)
 Housewife Superstar! (1976)
 The Sound of Edna (1978)

Biographical studies
Humphries has been the subject of several critical and biographical studies and a TV documentary:

The Real Barry Humphries by Peter Coleman. London: Coronet Books, 1991.
Dame Edna Everage and the Rise of Western Civilization: Backstage with Barry Humphries by John Lahr. London: Bloomsbury, 1991; and New York: Farrar Straus Giroux, 1992.
 
The Man Inside Dame Edna (2008), TV documentary
One Man Show: The Stages of Barry Humphries by Anne Pender. HarperCollins, 2010: ;

Fictional characters
Dame Edna Everage (Melbourne housewife)
Sir Les Patterson (Australian cultural attaché)
Sandy Stone (elderly Australian)
Barry McKenzie (Australian visitor to England)

Awards received 

 1975: Douglas Wilkie Medal
 1979: Comedy Performance of the Year, Society of West End Management, London (now known as the Laurence Olivier awards) for A Night with Dame Edna
 1990: TV Personality of the Year
 1993: J. R. Ackerley Prize for Autobiography for More, Please
 1993: Mo Award: Australian Show business Ambassador
 1994: Honorary Doctorate at Griffith University
 1997: Sir Peter Ustinov Award for Comedy presented at the Banff World Television Festival
 1997: Honoured Artists Award, Melbourne City Council
 1999: British Comedy Awards – Lifetime Achievement Award
 2000: Special Tony Award for a live theatrical event at the 55th Annual Tony Awards for Dame Edna: The Royal Tour
 2000: Special Achievement Award by the Outer Critics Circle for The Royal Tour
 2000: Best Play from the National Broadway Theatre Awards for The Royal Tour
 2003: Honorary Doctorate of Law at his alma mater, University of Melbourne
 2007: JC Williamson Award for his life's work in the Australian live performance industry.
 2011: Oldie of the Year for "his wonderful split personality which has entertained us for so many years"
 2013: Britain-Australia Society Award for contribution to the relationship between Britain and Australia
 2014: Aardman Slapstick Comedy Legend Award – lifetime achievement award.
 2016: Honorary Doctorate at the University of South Australia.
 2017: Honorary Fellow of King's College London.
Humphries has been nominated four times for a British Academy Television Award (BAFTA TV), all in the Best Light Entertainment Performance category:
1981: An Audience with Dame Edna Everage
1987: The Dame Edna Experience
1988: One More Audience with Dame Edna
1990: The Dame Edna Experience

He has received national honours in Australia and the United Kingdom:
1982: Officer of the Order of Australia (AO) for "services to the theatre" (Queen's Birthday Honours, Australian List)
1982: Granted a coat of arms by the College of Arms with a shield bearing crossed gladioli and the Sydney Opera House, supported by a shark and a possum both wearing butterfly glasses, along with other symbolism containing a funnel-web spider and a blowfly. His motto is "I share and I care".
2001: Centenary Medal for service to Australian society through acting and writing
2007: Commander of the Order of the British Empire (CBE) for "services to entertainment" (Queen's Birthday Honours, UK List)

Eponymous awards 
 Barry Award (1998)

References

External links 

Playbill biography
The man behind Dame Edna Everage (BBC News)
University of Melbourne Doctorate announcement
Barry Humphries at the National Library of Australia
Barry Humphries Collection held in the Australian Performing Arts Collection, Arts Centre Melbourne
Barry Humphries at the National Film and Sound Archive
Barry Humphries on Picture Australia
Andres Mario Zervigon: Essay on Humphries from a GLBTQ perspective at glbtq.com.
Barry Humphries & his favorite paintings

 
1934 births
Living people
20th-century Australian male actors
21st-century Australian male actors
Australian Commanders of the Order of the British Empire
Australian expatriates in the United Kingdom
Australian male comedians
Australian male film actors
Australian male television actors
Australian male voice actors
Australian male writers
Australian memoirists
Australian people of English descent
Australian satirists
Best Supporting Actor AACTA Award winners
Comedians from Melbourne
Douglas Wilkie Medal winners
Fellows of King's College London
Helpmann Award winners
Laurence Olivier Award winners
Melbourne Law School alumni
Officers of the Order of Australia
People educated at Camberwell Grammar School
People educated at Melbourne Grammar School
People with Asperger syndrome
Private Eye contributors
Recipients of the Centenary Medal
Blinky Bill
People from Camberwell, Victoria